Slaughter is an American glam metal band formed in Las Vegas by lead vocalist/rhythm guitarist Mark Slaughter and bassist Dana Strum. The band reached stardom in 1990 with their first album Stick It to Ya, which spawned several hit singles including "Up All Night", "Spend My Life", "Mad About You" and "Fly to the Angels.” The album reached double platinum status in the United States.

History
Slaughter formed in Las Vegas, Nevada, in late 1988, out of the ashes of lead vocalist Mark Slaughter and bassist Dana Strum's previous band, Vinnie Vincent Invasion. Vinnie Vincent Invasion's record company, Chrysalis Records, took the $4 million contract away from Vinnie Vincent for exceeding his credit line with the label, and transferred the contract to former members Slaughter and Strum. By 1989, Slaughter and Strum completed the lineup by recruiting lead guitarist Tim Kelly and drummer Blas Elias.

Slaughter's debut album Stick It to Ya had three singles released that hit the Billboard Hot 100: the hit "Fly to the Angels" (US#19), and the moderate hits "Up All Night" (US#27) and "Spend My Life" (US#39).  During this time, a song was released from the soundtrack to the film Bill & Ted's Bogus Journey. That song, titled "Shout It Out", was accompanied by a music video but failed to make the US Hot 100.

In 1992, the band released their second album, titled The Wild Life. It reached number eight on the US Billboard Top 200 Album Chart and was certified gold, but did not produce any Top 40 hits on the US Hot 100. The only single to reach the Hot 100 was the first single "Real Love" (US#69).

The band planned to record their third album in early 1994. However, in 1993 guitarist Tim Kelly was arrested for charges of drug trafficking, while bassist Dana Strum had a motorcycle accident that injured his playing hand. The delayed album was completed in February 1994 and the first single "Searchin'" was released. However, following Chrysalis Records absorption into EMI Records, Slaughter was dropped from EMI.

The band subsequently signed with CMC International, a new label at the time that signed many hard rock and metal bands in the face of the new grunge popularity. The label had major distribution through BMG. In 1995, Slaughter released the album Fear No Evil. The album did not have much success in North America, Europe, or much of Asia but performed well in Japan. Guitarist Dave Marshall (ex-Vince Neil band) had to fill in for Kelly at times, due to his legal problems.

Kelly's legal troubles ended and the band committed to their next album. In 1997, Revolution was released. The album featured a more eclectic and psychedelic sound, but failed to make an impact. On February 5, 1998, tragedy struck when guitarist Tim Kelly was killed in an auto accident in the Arizona desert. This deeply affected the group, but they were committed to continue with the band. Dave Marshall briefly performed as a touring guitarist for Slaughter in Japan. In 1998, they hired Jeff Blando as Kelly's replacement and began working on their next album. A live album titled Eternal Live was released featuring some of the band's last performances with Kelly.

In 1999, they released the album Back to Reality, featuring Blando as the new guitarist. Blando was previously in Left For Dead and Saigon Kick. Slaughter continues to play many rock package tours with other acts that saw prominence during the glam era of the 1980s and early 1990s. During the summer of 1999, while on the "Rock Never Stops Tour" (which included Ted Nugent and Night Ranger), Slaughter saw some of their previous singles on compilation albums. The VH-1 album "Power Ballads" included "Fly To The Angels"; "Up All Night" was included on Rhino Records "Hard Hitters". Slaughter also took part in the Summer 2000 "Poison, Cinderella, Dokken and Slaughter" tour.

In 2001, Slaughter was a part of the "Voices of Metal" tour featuring Vince Neil of Mötley Crüe, Ratt, and Vixen. Mark Slaughter and Dana Strum's former Vinnie Vincent Invasion bandmate Bobby Rock played as a touring drummer for Slaughter, filling in for Blas Elias on some shows of the Rock Never Stops Tour. In April 2004, Slaughter released a DVD-A entitled Then and Now that features 12 songs and 50 photos of the band over the years. Slaughter also released a DVD that features all of the music videos and behind the scenes footage during the 2004 season.

On July 13, 2007, Slaughter performed at glam metal festival Rocklahoma. However, Strum and Blando were not present during the band's performance, though they did perform with Vince Neil the following night. At the end of January 2008 Slaughter performed a show at Motley Cruise, a four-day cruise in the Caribbean with Vince Neil, Skid Row, Ratt, Endeverafter, Lynam.

Slaughter continues to tour and in 2017 they are scheduled to appear on the Monsters of Rock cruise and at Rocklahoma along with several other scheduled concerts.

Band members

Current members
Mark Slaughter – lead vocals, rhythm guitar, keyboards, piano, tambourine (1988–present)
Dana Strum – bass guitar, backing vocals (1988–present)
Jeff "Blando" Bland – lead guitar, backing vocals (1998–present)
Blas Elias – drums, percussion (1988–2003, 2019–present)

Former members 
Tim Kelly – lead guitar, backing vocals (1988–1998; died 1998)
Zoltan Chaney – drums, percussion (2011–2019)

Former and current touring members 
Dave Marshall – lead guitar, backing vocals (1995, 1998)
Bobby Rock – drums (2003–2004)
Timothy "Timbo" DiDuro – drums (2004–2011)
Will Hunt - drums (2011 - current)

Timeline

Discography

Studio albums

Live albums
Stick It Live (1990)
Eternal Live (1998)
Ecstasy Live 1991 (2022)

Compilations
Mass Slaughter: The Best of Slaughter (1995)
Then and Now (2002)
10 Greatest Songs (2011)

Home videos
 From the Beginning (1991) (Gold)
 The Wild Life (1992) (Gold)

Singles

Tours

 Hot in the Shade Tour 1990
 Stick it to Ya Tour 1991
 The Wild Life Tour 1992-1993
 Fear No Evil Tour 1995-1996
 Revolution Tour 1997
 Rock Never Stops Tour 1998
 Rock Never Stops Tour 1999
 Power to the People Tour 2000
 Voices of Metal Tour 2001
 Rock Never Stops Tour 2003
 Rock Never Stops Tour 2004

References

External links
 Official website
 Interview with Mark Slaughter
 Interview with Blas Elias

 
1988 establishments in Nevada
Chrysalis Records artists
Heavy metal musical groups from Nevada
Musical groups established in 1988
Musical groups from Las Vegas
American glam metal musical groups